Statistics of Swiss Super League in the 1967–68 season.

Overview
There were 14 teams contesting in the 1967–68 Nationalliga A. These were the top 12 teams from the previous 1966–67 season and the two newly promoted teams Luzern and Bellinzona. The three teams Zürich, Grasshopper Club and Lugano all ended the season with 38 points. Thus all three then had to play a championship play-off round. Zürich won both games and became champions. Young Fellows Zürich and Grenchen suffered relegation.

League standings

Results

References

Sources
 Switzerland 1967–68 at RSSSF

Swiss Football League seasons
Swiss
1967–68 in Swiss football